Sir Edward Hugh Bray  (15 April 1874 – 27 November 1950) was a British businessman and English first-class cricketer active 1895–97 who played for Middlesex and Cambridge University. He was born in Kensington; died in Rye, Sussex. A temporary brigadier-general in the British Army, he was a son of Sir Edward Bray.

On 12 September 1919 Bray was made a Companion of the Order of the Star of India for meritorious service in connection with the war in India.

References

1874 births
1950 deaths
English cricketers
Middlesex cricketers
Cambridge University cricketers
Companions of the Order of the Star of India
P. F. Warner's XI cricketers
A. J. Webbe's XI cricketers
Marylebone Cricket Club cricketers
British Army brigadiers
British Army personnel of World War I
Military personnel from London
Sheriffs of Kolkata